Robert Eugene Webber (November 27, 1933 – April 27, 2007) was an American theologian known for his work on worship and the early church. He played a key role in the Convergence Movement, a movement among evangelical and charismatic churches in the United States to blend charismatic worship with liturgies from the Book of Common Prayer and other liturgical sources.

Early life
The son of a Baptist minister, Webber was raised for the first seven years of his life in the small village of Mitulu in the Belgian Congo where his parents were missionaries with the Africa Inland Mission. Chester Robert Webber and Harriett Basto Russell Webber had three children, Robert, an older sister Eleanor (Webber) Entwistle, and a younger brother, Kenneth Webber. His family returned to the United States when his brother became seriously ill and his father then became pastor of the Montgomeryville Baptist Church in Colmar, Pennsylvania.

Family
Webber was married twice. First, to N. Dawn McCallum Webber and they had 3 children: John, Alexandra, and Stefany. His second marriage was to Joanne Lindsell Webber, who had one son, Jeremy Buffam.

Education
He received his bachelor's degree from Bob Jones University in 1956 and went on to earn a divinity degree from the Reformed Episcopal Seminary in 1959, and a master's degree in theology from Covenant Theological Seminary in 1960. In 1968 he received his doctoral degree in theology from Concordia Seminary in Saint Louis.

Theological influence
Webber began teaching theology at Wheaton College in 1968. Existentialism was the primary focus of Webber's research and lectures during his first years at Wheaton.  However, he soon shifted his focus to the early church. In 1978 he wrote Common Roots, a book that examined the impact of 2nd-century Christianity on the modern church.

In 1985 Webber wrote Evangelicals on the Canterbury Trail: Why Evangelicals Are Attracted to the Liturgical Church, in which he described the reasons behind his own gradual shift away from his fundamentalist/evangelical background toward the Anglican tradition. Webber faced an enormous amount of criticism from evangelicals in response to this book. Nevertheless, his work was highly influential, and his ideas grew in popularity in evangelical circles.

During the latter half of his life, Webber took a special interest in Christian worship practices. He wrote more than 40 books on the topic of worship, focusing on how the worship practices of the ancient church have value for the church in the 21st-century postmodern era.  Among his books are Ancient-Future Worship, Ancient-Future Faith, Ancient-Future Time, Ancient-Future Evangelism, The Younger Evangelicals, and The Divine Embrace. Webber also served as editor of The Complete Library of Christian Worship (1995), an eight-volume series created to serve as a comprehensive reference for professors, students, pastors, and worship leaders. The series draws on several thousand texts and publications and covers topics like Old and New Testament worship and contemporary applications for music and the arts.

Webber founded The Robert E. Webber Institute for Worship Studies in Jacksonville, Florida, in 1998. The school offers Doctor of Worship Studies and Master of Worship Studies degrees.  It is the only graduate institution in the country to focus exclusively on worship education.  He remained president of the institute until his death. Jim Hart currently serves as president.

In 2006, he organized and edited the "Call to an Ancient Evangelical Future", a document intended "to restore the priority of the divinely inspired biblical story of God's acts in history".

Webber died of pancreatic cancer on April 27, 2007, at his home in Sawyer, Michigan, aged 73.

In 2012, Trinity School for Ministry, an evangelical Anglican seminary in Ambridge, Pennsylvania, established the Robert E. Webber Center for an Ancient Evangelical Future. The Center's mission is to continue Webber's vision: to recover the theological, spiritual and liturgical resources of the ancient Christian Tradition for the church today.

Partial bibliography
 The Secular Saint: A Case for Evangelical Social Responsibility (1979) ISBN 978-0310366409
Celebrating Our Faith: Worship as Outreach and Nurture (1986) ISBN 978-0060692865
 The Majestic Tapestry (1986) 
Evangelicals on the Canterbury Trail: Why Evangelicals Are Attracted to the Liturgical Church (1989 reprint [1985]) ISBN 9780819214768
 Worship is a Verb (1992) 
 Liturgical Evangelism (1992) [Reprint of Celebrating our Faith under different publisher] ISBN 978-0819215963
 The Book of Daily Prayer (1993) 
 The Worship Phenomenon: A Dynamic New Awakening in Worship is Reviving the Body of Christ (1994) 
 Worship Old and New (1994)  
 The Complete Library of Christian Worship, 8 vols. (1995)
 The Biblical Foundations for Worship, Volume 1 
 Twenty Centuries of Christian Worship, Volume 2 
 The Renewal of Sunday Worship, Volume 3 
 Music & the Arts in Worship, Book 1, Volume 4 
 Music & the Arts in Worship, Book 2, Volume 4 
 The Services of Christian Year, Volume 5 
 The Sacred Actions of Christian Worship, Volume 6 
 The Ministries of Christian Worship, Volume 7 
 Blended Worship: Achieving Substance and Relevance in Worship (1996) 
 The Book of Family Prayer (1996) 
 Planning Blended Worship: The Creative Mixture of Old and New (1998) 
 Ancient-Future Faith: Rethinking Evangelicalism for a Postmodern World (1999) 
 The Prymer: The Prayer Book of the Medieval Era Adapted for Contemporary Use (2000) 
 The People of the Truth with Rodney Clapp (2001) 
 Journey to Jesus: The Worship, Evangelism, and Nurture Mission of the Church (2001)  
 The Younger Evangelicals: Facing the Challenges of the New World (2002) 
 Ancient-Future Evangelism: Making Your Church a Faith-Forming Community (2003) 
 Ancient-Future Time: Forming Spirituality through the Christian Year (2004) 
The Secular Saint: A Case for Evangelical Social Responsibility (REPRINT by Wipf & Stock, 2004) ISBN 978-1592446308
 The Divine Embrace: Recovering the Passionate Spiritual Life [Ancient-Future Series] (2006) 
 Listening to the Beliefs of Emerging Churches: Five Perspectives (Editor, 2007) 
 Ancient-Future Worship (2008) 
 Who Gets to Narrate the World?: Contending for the Christian Story in an Age of Rivals (2008) 
Evangelicals on the Canterbury Trail: Why Evangelicals Are Attracted to the Liturgical Church (Revised with Lester Ruth, 2012) ISBN 978-0819228512

Some of Webber's books were republished under different titles.

References

External links
 The Robert E. Webber Institute for Worship Studies
 Robert E. Webber Center for an Ancient Evangelical Future
 Robert E. Webber, Theologian of 'Ancient-Future' Faith, Dies at 73 article in Christianity Today
 2006 interview
 Trinity School for Ministry

1933 births
2007 deaths
American Christian writers
American theologians
Christian writers
Deaths from pancreatic cancer
People from Berrien County, Michigan
Deaths from cancer in Michigan
Wheaton College (Illinois) faculty
Bob Jones University alumni
Reformed Episcopal Seminary alumni
Covenant Theological Seminary alumni
Concordia Seminary alumni